Interdimensional may refer to:

 Interdimensional hypothesis
 Interdimensional doorway
 Interdimensional travel
 Interdimensional being

Dimension